Kate McDonald (born 1 August 2000) is an Australian artistic gymnast. She is the 2022 Commonwealth Games champion on the balance beam.

Early life
McDonald was born in East Melbourne in 2000. She took up gymnastics when she was five years old.

Gymnastics career

2022
McDonald was selected to compete at the 2022 Commonwealth Games alongside Georgia Godwin, Romi Brown, Breanna Scott, and Emily Whitehead. Together they won the silver medal in the team competition, behind England. During event finals McDonald won gold on balance beam ahead of teammate Godwin and Emma Spence of Canada.
Kate is now training at Cheltenham Youth Club by coach Jeb Silsbury.

Competitive history

References

External links
 

2000 births
Living people
Australian female artistic gymnasts
Gymnasts at the 2022 Commonwealth Games
Commonwealth Games medallists in gymnastics
Commonwealth Games gold medallists for Australia
Commonwealth Games silver medallists for Australia
20th-century Australian women
21st-century Australian women
People from East Melbourne
Sportspeople from Melbourne
Medallists at the 2022 Commonwealth Games